Voltage control and reactive power management are two facets of an ancillary service that enables reliability of the transmission networks and facilitates the electricity market on these networks. Both aspects of this activity are intertwined (voltage change in an alternating current (AC) network is effected through production or absorption of reactive power), so within this article the term voltage control will be primarily used to designate this essentially single activity, as suggested by Kirby & Hirst (1997). Voltage control does not include reactive power injections within one AC cycle; these are a part of a separate ancillary service, so-called system stability service. The transmission of reactive power is limited by its nature, so the voltage control is provided through pieces of equipment distributed throughout the power grid, unlike the frequency control that is based on maintaining the overall active power balance in the system.

Need for voltage control 
Kirby & Hirst indicate three reasons behind the need for voltage control:
 the power network equipment is designed for a narrow voltage range, so is the power consuming equipment on the customer side. Operation outside of this range will cause the equipment to fail; 
 reactive power causes heating in the generators and the transmission lines, thermal limits will require restricting the production and the flow of real (active) power; 
 injection of reactive power into transmission lines causes losses that waste power, forcing an increase in power supplied by the prime mover.
Use of specialized voltage control devices in the grid also improves the power system stability by reducing the fluctuations of the rotor angle of a synchronous generator (that are caused by generators sourcing or sinking the reactive power).

Power buses and systems that exhibit large changes in voltage when the reactive power conditions change are called weak systems, while the ones that have relatively smaller changes are strong (numerically, the strength is expressed as a short circuit ratio that is higher for the stronger systems).

Absorption and production of reactive power 
Devices absorb reactive energy if they have lagging power factor (are inductor-like) and produce reactive energy if they have a leading power factor (are capacitor-like).

Electric grid equipment units typically either supply  or consume the reactive power:
 Synchronous generator will provide reactive power if overexcited and absorb it if underexcited, subject to the limits of the generator capability curve.
 Transformers will always absorb the reactive power.
 Power lines will either absorb or provide reactive power: overhead power lines will provide reactive power at low load, but as the load increases past the surge impedance of the line, the lines start consuming an increasing amount of reactive power. The underground power lines are capacitive, so they are loaded below the surge impedance and provide reactive power.  
 Electrical loads usually absorb the reactive power, with the power factor for typical appliances ranging from 0.65 (household equipment with electical motors, like a washing machine) to 1.0 (purely resistive loads like incandescent lamps).

In a typical electrical grid, the basics of the voltage control are provided by the synchronous generators. These generators are equipped with automatic voltage regulators that adjust the excitation field keeping the voltage at the generator's terminals within the target range.

The task of additional reactive power compensation (also known as voltage compensation) is assigned to compensating devices:
 passive (either permanently connected or switched) sinks of reactive power (e.g., shunt reactors that are similar to transformers in construction, with a single winding and iron core). A shunt reactor is typically connected to an end of a long transmission line or a weak system to prevent overvoltage under light load (Ferranti effect);
 passive sources of reactive power (e. g., shunt or series capacitors). 
 shunt capacitors are used in power systems since 1910s and are popular due to low cost and relative ease of deployment. The amount of reactive power supplied by a shunt capacitor is proportional to the square of the line voltage, so the capacitor contributes less under low-voltage conditions (frequently caused by the lack of reactive power). This is a serious drawback, as the supply of reactive power by a capacitor drops when it is most needed;
 series capacitors are used to compensate for the inductive reactance of the loaded overhead power lines. These devices, connected in series to the power conductors are typically used to lower the reactive power losses and to increase the amount of active power that can be transmitted through the line, with the supply of reactive power with self-regulation (the supply fortuitously increases with higher load) being the secondary consideration; The voltage across a series capacitor is typically low (within the regulation range of the network, few percent of the rated voltage), so its construction is relatively low-cost. However, in the case of a short on the load side, the capacitor will be briefly exposed to the full line voltage, thus protection circuits are provisioned, usually involving spark gaps, ZnO varistors, and switches;   
 active compensators (e.g., synchronous condensers, static var compensators, static synchronous compensators that can be either sources or sinks of reactive power;
 regulating transformers (e.g., tap-changing transformers).

The passive compensation devices can be permanently attached, or are switched (connected and disconnected) either manually, using a timer, or automatically based on sensor data. The active devices are by nature self-adjusting. The tap-changing transformers with under-load tap-changing (ULTC) feature can be used to control the voltage directly. The operation of all tap-changing transformers in the system needs to be synchronized between the transformers and with the application of shunt capacitors.

Due to the localized nature of reactive power balance, the standard approach is to manage the reactive power locally (decentralized method). The proliferation of microgrids might make the flexible centralized approach more economical.

Reactive power reserves 
The system should be capable of providing additional amounts of reactive power very quickly (dynamic requirement) since a single failure of a generator or a transmission line (that has to be planned for) has the potential to immediately increase the load on some of the remaining transmission lines. The nature of overhead power lines is that as the load increases, the lines start consuming an increasing amount of reactive power that needs to be replaced. Thus a large transmission system requires reactive power reserves just like it needs reserves for the real power. Since the reactive power does not travel over the wires as well as the real power, there is an incentive to concentrate its production close to the load. Restructuring of electric power systems takes this area of the power grid out of hands of the integrated power utility, so the trend is to push the problem onto the customer and require the load to operate with a near-unity power factor.

See also 
 Active Network Management

References

Sources 
 
 
 
 

Electric power transmission